Eric S. Rosen (born March 25, 1953) is an associate justice of the Kansas Supreme Court. He was appointed to the Court by Governor Kathleen Sebelius in 2005.

Personal life

Eric S. Rosen was born May 25, 1953 in Topeka, Kansas. He earned his Bachelor's and a master's degree with honors at the University of Kansas and his Juris Doctor at Washburn University School of Law in 1984.

He is married to Elizabeth A. "Libby" Rosen, and has four children and five grandchildren. He's an active member in the Topeka High School Booster Club, Indian Woods Neighborhood Association, Temple Beth Shalom, and YMCA.

Professional life
Before attending law school, Rosen worked as a social worker for Topeka Public Schools for three years and chaired the social work department for two years. After graduating from Washburn he became an assistant public defender. Rosen later served as an assistant district attorney in Shawnee County, Kansas and eventually took the office of associate general counsel to the Kansas Securities Commission before entering the private practice of law in 1990.

In 1993 Rosen took his first judgeship on the District Court for Shawnee County. He was appointed Chief Justice to the Kansas Sentencing Commission in July 2002. During this time Rosen was a member of Koch Crime Commission, lectured at the Menninger School of Law and Psychiatry, 2004-05 President of the Sam A. Crow Inns of Court and was appointed to the presidential commission charged with commemorating the 50th anniversary of the Brown v. Board of Education decision.

In 2005, Governor Kathleen Sebelius appointed Rosen from a field of twelve applicants to the Kansas Supreme Court to replace Justice Robert Gernon, who died from cancer. He faced his first retention vote in the 2008 election.

Awards
 Martin Luther King Living the Dream Humanitarian Award (2002)
 Attorney General's Victim's Service Award for Outstanding Judge (2000)
 Topeka Capital Journal Kansan of Distinction For Law (1999)

References

External links
Official Biography

20th-century American Jews
1953 births
Living people
Kansas state court judges
Justices of the Kansas Supreme Court
Politicians from Topeka, Kansas
University of Kansas alumni
Washburn University School of Law alumni
People from Goodland, Kansas
Kansas Democrats
21st-century American judges
21st-century American Jews
Public defenders
District attorneys in Kansas